Mark Allen Norell (born July 26, 1957) is an American paleontologist, acknowledged as one of the most important living vertebrate paleontologists. He is currently the chairman of paleontology and a research associate at the American Museum of Natural History. He is best known as the discoverer of the first theropod embryo and for the description of feathered dinosaurs. Norell is credited with the naming of the genera Apsaravis, Byronosaurus, Citipati, Tsaagan, and Achillobator. His work regularly appears in major scientific journals (including cover stories in Science and Nature) and was listed by Time magazine as one of the ten most significant science stories of 1993, 1994 and 1996.

Norell is both a fellow of the Explorer's Club and the Willi Hennig Society.

Career
Norell's research has encompassed a number of different areas, from the theoretical study of diversity through time, his doctoral dissertation on alligator phylogeny, and his postdoctoral work on evolutionary variations in maize.  Following his M.S. at San Diego, Norell published papers on the efficacy of the fossil record in capturing phylogenetic history, and how missing data can influence the estimation of phylogeny.

Norell became a curator at the American Museum of Natural History in 1990 and helped oversee the renovation of the Halls of Vertebrate Evolution. The organization, where visitors progress in a circular motion around the floor, mirrors the evolutionary patterns of a phylogenetic tree. Thus, guests begin their exploration with the simplest vertebrates, placoderms and bony fishes, and conclude their visit with advanced mammals, such as mammoths and artiodactyls.

Currently, Norell studies relationships of small carnivorous dinosaurs to modern birds and develops new ways of observing fossils through CT scans and imaging computers. He has led over twenty international paleontological expeditions, in locales such as Patagonia, Cuba, the Chilean Andes, the Sahara and West Africa. The famous Mongolia project, which has delivered numerous discoveries in vertebrate evolution, has received world-wide attention.

Notable discoveries
Mark Norell is the direct discoverer of the enigmatic theropod Shuvuuia, co-led the group that discovered Ukhaa Tolgod, the richest Cretaceous terrestrial vertebrate fossil locality in the world, discovered the first embryo of a theropod dinosaur, described a series of dinosaurs with feathers, and discovered the first direct evidence of dinosaur brooding. Norell's theoretical work has a focus of data evaluation in large cladistic sets, as well as fossil pattern estimation through phylogeny, in order to see trends in diversity and extinction. He has authored several papers that discuss the relationship between stratigraphic position and phylogenetic topology.

Honors and distinctions
In 1998, Norell was named a New York City Leader of the Year by the New York Times. In 2000, he was honored as a distinguished Alumnus of California State University Long Beach. His popular science book, Discovering Dinosaurs, won Scientific American's Young Readers Book of the Year Award. Another of his books for the general public, entitled A Nest of Dinosaurs, was given an Orbis Pictus Award by the National Council of Teachers.

Dinosaur Hunters 
Dinosaur Hunters (1996, written and directed by Kage Glantz credited as Kage Kleiner, narrated by Michael Carroll) is a National Geographic documentary about the 1990s AMNH expeditions led in Mongolia, in the Gobi Desert, by paleontologists Mike Novacek and Mark Norell.

Recent publications
Norell, M. A., J. M. Clark, and P. J. Makovicky. "Relationships Among Maniraptora: Problems and Prospects." Yale Peabody Museum, special volume honoring John Ostrom (in press).
Norell, M .A., P. J. Makovicky, and P. J. Currie. "The Beaks of Ostrich Dinosaurs." Nature (in press).
Ji, Q., M. A. Norell, K.-Q. Gao, S.-A. Ji, and D. Ren. "The Distribution of Integumentary Structures in a Feathered Dinosaur." Nature 410 (2001): 1084-1088.
Norell, M. A., and J. Clarke. "A New Fossil Near the Base of Aves." Nature 409 (2001): 181-184.
Norell, M. A., J. M. Clark, and L. M. Chiappe. "An Embryo of an Oviraptorid (Dinosauria: Theropoda) from the Late Cretaceous of Ukhaa Tolgod, Mongolia." American Museum Novitates 3315 (2001): 17 pp.
Norell, M.A., P. Makovicky, and J. M. Clark. "A New Troodontid from Ukhaa Tolgod, Late Cretaceous, Mongolia." Journal of Vertebrate Paleontology Rapid Communication 20, no. 1 (2000): 7-11.
Norell, M .A., L. Dingus, and E. S. Gaffney. Discovering Dinosaurs (2nd edition with 9 new sections). Berkeley: University of California Press, 2000.
Norell, M. A., and P. Makovicky. "Important Features of the Dromaeosaur Skeleton II: Information From Newly Collected Specimens of Velociraptor mongoliensis." American Museum Novitates 3282 (1999): 45 pp.

References 

American geneticists
American paleontologists
1957 births
Living people
People associated with the American Museum of Natural History
 
People from Saint Paul, Minnesota